Serie A is the second tier of the Italian Rugby Union championship. Until the creation of the Super 10 (now Top12) in a 2002 restructuring exercise, it was the top tier.

Serie A is composed of 4 leagues of 6 teams. During the season, which runs from September to May, each team plays each other team in the same league at home and away. At the completion of this phase of competition, the top 2 teams from each league play off in semi-finals and a final to determine the champions who are then promoted to the Eccellenza competition for the following season.

References

 
Rugby union leagues in Italy
1986 establishments in Italy
Sports leagues established in 1986